John Starks (born 1965) is an American former basketball player.

John Starks may also refer to:
John "Jabo" Starks (1938–2018), American drummer from the James Brown band

See also
John Stark (disambiguation)